"Who's Sorry Now?" is a popular song with music written by Ted Snyder and lyrics by Bert Kalmar and Harry Ruby. It was published in 1923, when Isham Jones had a major hit with it. Other popular versions in 1923 were by Marion Harris, Original Memphis Five, Lewis James, and Irving Kaufman. 

"Who's Sorry Now?" was also featured in the Marx Brothers film A Night in Casablanca (1946), directed by Archie Mayo and released by United Artists. It was also used in the 1950 film Three Little Words when it was sung by Gloria DeHaven.

Karen Elson with Vince Giordano & The Nighthawks recorded the song for an episode of the HBO television series Boardwalk Empire.

The song gave American singer Connie Francis her major solo debut hit, which in March 1958 reached number 4 on Billboard's Hot 100. The single, which would become Francis's signature record, spent a total of 22 weeks on the Hot 100 – the longest of any of her hits — and was the first of her eight singles to be certified gold in America. In May and June 1958 the single spent six weeks at number one in on the UK singles chart.

Connie Francis version

Background
"Who's Sorry Now?" was recorded in 1957 by Connie Francis, and since then the song has become closely identified with her due to the immense popularity of her version which was her breakout hit. Since 1955, Francis had recorded 20 sides for MGM Records and only one ("The Majesty of Love", a duet with country singer Marvin Rainwater that eventually became a million-selling record) charted at all. Due to her near-complete failure as a recording artist, MGM informed her that her contract would end after one more disc. With her music career on the line, Francis's father suggested she record "Who's Sorry Now". He was convinced that it would have crossover appeal with both older listeners and teenagers if the song were given a modernized sound. Francis strongly objected to the idea on the grounds that selling the youth audience on an almost 35-year-old song was "ridiculous", but she finally agreed to it as a favor to her father.

Reception
Backed with "You Were Only Fooling (While I Was Falling In Love)", the single was recorded on October 2, 1957. Initial attention was modest and it looked to be as much of a nonfactor as Francis's previous records, but after Dick Clark's championing of it on American Bandstand in January 1958, the single rose to number 4 on the Billboard Hot 100 that spring, with eventual US sales totaling one million units. In the UK, it was number 1 for six weeks in May and June 1958.

Chart performance

Weekly charts

Year-end charts

Other notable versions
The song has been recorded by a number of artists. Among the most prominent are:
Marie Osmond's third studio album, released in 1975, featured a remake of "Who's Sorry Now" as its title cut; this version reached number 40 on the Billboard Hot 100 also ranking on Billboard'''s C&W chart and Easy Listening chart at respectively number 29 and 21.
Lyn Paul had a 1974 single release of "Who's Sorry Now" which peaked at number 54 in the UK and at number 60 in Australia.
Johnnie Ray recorded his version in 1956 for the Columbia Records label. It reached number 17 in the UK Singles Chart in February 1956.

See also
List of UK Singles Chart number ones of the 1950sMills Music, Inc. v. Snyder''

References

External links
 Full (longer) lyrics of earlier versions as transcribed from recordings

Songs with music by Ted Snyder
Songs with lyrics by Bert Kalmar
1923 songs
Johnnie Ray songs
Connie Francis songs
Marie Osmond songs
Songs with music by Harry Ruby
Number-one singles in South Africa
UK Singles Chart number-one singles
MGM Records singles
1923 singles
1956 singles
1957 singles
1974 singles
1975 singles